Eden is a British reality TV series; the first series was broadcast on Channel 4 from 18 July to 8 August 2016. It featured 23 participants living for a year in a remote part of Scotland, attempting to build a self-sufficient community. Filmed by the participants themselves, production began in March 2016. Unknown to the participants, broadcasting ceased after four episodes due to poor viewer ratings. However, the final 5 episodes were broadcast in August 2017 as  Eden: Paradise Lost.

Synopsis 
The aim of the show was to act as a social experiment, to ascertain if the participants could build a self-sufficient community away from the technology and hectic pace of modern life. Producers hoped that the participants would not merely survive, but thrive, and that the footage would tell both their human stories as well as relate the practicalities involved.

The participants were given no other goal or task than the broad aim of building a community, being allowed to decide for themselves how to feed, shelter and organise themselves. Participants were solicited with an online advert that asked, "Are you tired of modern life? Would you like to start all over again?" Participants had the choice to leave the show at any time, subject to following a specified protocol.

Production 

Channel 4 first proposed the project to the owner of the estate in December 2015. The series was produced by KEO films. Series producer is Liz Foley. The show's Executive Producers are Andrew Palmer and Coleen Flynn.

Genesis 
A reality TV based social experiment based around community building had previously been pioneered by the BBC, who broadcast Castaway 2000 (from 1 January 2000 to 1 January 2001), following the efforts of thirty-six men, women, and children on a remote Scottish island. According to the Radio Times however, Castaway's "integrity as a pioneering format" was compromised by "regular interference and assistance from the outside world" and the production team's alleged focus on conflict. Since Castaway, the idea for a truly unmediated show had been discussed by broadcasters, but it was not until three things came into alignment before the idea was taken from the idea stage to execution - the use of fixed rig filming technology as pioneered by One Born Every Minute, the change in appetite for a return to social experiment style reality TV (citing the evolution of Big Brother into a "hysterical grotfest"), and the "growth of disenfranchisement and interest in self-sufficient living" following the late 2000s recession. It has been argued that the timing of the show coming so soon after the "start again" mood after Brexit referendum was either genius planning or extremely lucky timing.

Previewing the show, the Radio Times identified several failings of the Castaway production that Eden should avoid by getting the right number of interesting participants, ensuring every moment is filmed, maintaining the isolation of the participants—preventing visitors and journalists from gaining access, and stopping participants smuggling in radios, mobile phones, etc.—prevent participants leaving (including temporarily, for funerals etc.), don't make the experience too "grim" for participants or viewers, set up accommodation in advance, and prevent the non-cooperation of participants (i.e. those who choose to stay but try not to be filmed). It was believed by the previewer that the enhanced filming set up would ensure no moment was missed and tight security would prevent incursion. They were unsure whether the reduced number of participants would be small enough to solve the casting issues.

Filming 
Filming began in March 2016, to last for one year. Footage for the show was obtained in three ways: from a network of fixed rig cameras, from four embedded camera operators, and GoPro personal cameras. Four of the participants, Ben, Jane, Matt and Oli, were the designated embedded camera operators and were expected to film proceedings in addition to being fully functioning members of the community. All other participants were issued with their own personal Go Pro cameras, to supplement filming. The fixed camera setup comprised a large network of remotely operated CCTV cameras, the rig for which had to be transported onto the site by helicopter. There were a total of 45 cameras.

Mixed in with the filming shown during episodes was a small amount of footage of participants filmed individually in pieces to camera before it began, where they give some information about their motivations and beliefs.

Isolation 
The participants were isolated from the outside world, and were not going to be told of any news or current events that take place during the experiment. Despite this, in Episode Two, a pair of fisherman are seen visiting the beach, later returning to leave a package of food and drink.

According to the Radio Times, after the experiment had begun but before its first broadcast, journalists had been allowed access to the participants camp in a "tightly controlled set visit", observing evidence of their early achievements.

Supplies 
The participants were allowed to specify in advance what supplies, tools and equipment they thought they would need, which was left in place for them on site. Each was also permitted to carry into the site some personal belongings, in a large rucksack.

These initial supplies included livestock (chickens, sheep and goats) and seeds and vegetables, and basic building materials such as tarpaulin and pipes. The participants were supplied with a basic set of food rations, with the expectation that within a short period they would become self-sufficient in terms of food supply, living on the produce of a vegetable garden and the milk, eggs and meat from the livestock. At the start of filming, most of the livestock was either pregnant or too young to be slaughtered.

Observations 
According to show producers, three months into the experiment the participants were getting along well, the atmosphere being described as "not totally harmonious, but it’s not explosive in a negative sense." Gabriel Tate of the Radio Times said in July 2016 that they were achieving impressive results as they worked together to overcome challenges.

Filming location 
The location of experiment is the remote peninsula of Ardnamurchan in Inverness-shire, on the west coast of Scotland.

The Eden site is located on the private uninhabited Ardnamurchan Estate, formerly used by No. 10 (Inter-Allied) Commando as a training area during World War II. It is bordered on one side by Cu na Croise Bay, looking out onto the Atlantic Ocean. The other three sides have been enclosed with a six-foot-high fence. The nature of the site ranges from dunes to woodland to marsh.

The Eden site is roughly triangular, with a coastline on the NW and NE side, and the rest of the peninsula to the south. Covered mostly in forest, there is a beach on the NW coast, and between the beach and the forest lies a strip of dunes. The site only included two pre-existing structures, located together between the dunes and the forest: a corrugated iron tool shed, and an unenclosed hay barn. This became the location group's first camp site, being known as the Summer site. Another site, becoming known as the Winter Camp, was then established on the north east side, inside the forest but near the coast.

The estate is owned by Donald Houston, who says it has been uninhabited since the Bronze Age, and describes it as a challenging environment, with the prevailing wet and windy conditions and "not very fertile" ground posing a challenge to building shelter and growing crops, although the site does have some more sheltered areas. Initially depicted as wet and windy, by episode two the site had also been covered in snow, but by episode three, which began six weeks into the experiment, it was at times sunny enough for the group to wear beach clothing.

To ensure no members of the public enter the site during filming, the production company was granted a temporary suspension of the public right of access by Highland Council and Scottish Ministers. The application was controversial, with objectors expressing fears for the environment, and supporters viewing it as a potential boost for the local economy.

Participants 
During casting, it was reported there would be 24 participants but a total of 23 participants began the experiment, comprising 13 men and 10 women. Several have partners who they will be away from for the duration of the experiment. Once filming had begun, the identities of participants were initially withheld by Channel 4 until they had decided when the series would be broadcast.

Participants were selected to provide a broad cross section of skills deemed to be needed in the community.

On the day of the first broadcast, the Radio Times identified six participants as "ones to watch": Jack, Katie, Lloyd, Jane, Jasmine and Raphael.

Broadcast 
The show was first broadcast weekly on Channel 4, in the 9pm-10pm Monday slot (episode one being an extended 80 minutes). Due to strong language and the presence of animal slaughter, Channel 4 rates the programme as only suitable for viewers over the age of 16.

Channel 4 released extra footage on their website - The Making of Eden, and Counting Down to Eden (featuring some of the participants in the hours before entering the site).

Episodes

Series 1 (2016)

Series 2 (2017) — Eden: Paradise Lost

Reception 
With no other added features or elements, the show was described by the Radio Times as an ambitious "new kind of television", being atypical of the reality genre. To avoid piquing the interest of journalists who might otherwise try to independently visit the site, Channel 4 did not release any preview footage.

Since the first episodes were broadcast, there was comment about attempts to contact the team while in the wilderness. Indeed, in one of the episodes there was an interaction with people, who gave them provisions. Channel 4 asked the public to respect the section 11 ruling that allows them to cut off the land for filming.

In March 2017, ten contestants had survived the full year experiment, but arrived home to find that the show had been cancelled after 4 episodes. The UK press picked up that many of the contestants left the site due to the disillusionment with the experiment, as well as tales of apparent near-starvation. Those who had left the camp took to social media, suggesting the editing of the show did not offer a full picture.

Status 
Following the first run of four episodes in August 2016, no further episodes were broadcast for a year, and future plans were unclear. This led to speculation in the media about the status of the show and its participants. Channel 4's 2017 preview ad mentions Eden.
On 23 March 2017, it was announced that Eden had finished; but Channel 4 later confirmed that more episodes would be shown in August 2017. On 7 August 2017 Eden: Paradise Lost was scheduled; a previewer said "the group remained in their wilderness, arguing, longing for food and going quietly cuckoo. And suddenly, Eden is back ... oddly compelling in its attritional grimness".

See also
 Castaway 2000, BBC TV Show
 Utopia, 2014 American TV series

References

External links
 Letter from the Scottish Government granting the suspension of public access (pdf download from Highland Council website)
 Ardnamurchan, Cul Na Croise on Canmore.co.uk
 Eden C4 on Twitter

2016 British television series debuts
2017 British television series endings
2010s British reality television series
Channel 4 reality television shows
English-language television shows
Television shows set in Scotland